The 2008-09 season is the 119th season of competitive football in Denmark.

Domestic competitions

Transfer deals

National team

Players
The following players appeared for Denmark during the 2008-09 season. All caps and goals are tallied for the 2008-09 season only.

|-
! colspan="9"  style="background:#b0d3fb; text-align:left;"|

|-
! colspan="9"  style="background:#b0d3fb; text-align:left;"|

|-
! colspan="9"  style="background:#b0d3fb; text-align:left;"|

Friendly matches
The home team is on the left column; the away team is on the right column.

World Cup qualifiers
Denmark competed in Group 1 of the 2010 FIFA World Cup qualification tournament.

The home team is on the left column; the away team is on the right column.

League XI national team

On December 5, 2008, a 20-man squad Denmark League XI national football team was named to play the 2009 King's Cup in Thailand. In the following month, a total ten players pulled out of the squad and had to be replaced in turn.

Olsen had initially refrained from selecting players from AaB due to their participation in the UEFA Cup, and when F.C. Copenhagen also advanced in that tournament, Copenhagen players Mathias Jørgensen, Hjalte Bo Nørregaard, Thomas Kristensen, and Martin Vingaard were replaced. Additionally, Mikkel Bischoff, Steffen Kielstrup, Anders Randrup, Thomas Rasmussen, Christopher Poulsen, as well as replacement player Jonas Troest, all had to pull out due to injuries.

The team played two games, as it won the tournament. The number of caps and goals reflect performances during the two matches.

Players

|-
! colspan="9"  style="background:#b0d3fb; text-align:left;"|

|-
! colspan="9"  style="background:#b0d3fb; text-align:left;"|

|-
! colspan="9"  style="background:#b0d3fb; text-align:left;"|

Schedule

See also
F.C. Copenhagen season 2008-09

References